Oliver Freaney (1929 – 27 September 1991) was a Gaelic footballer who played for the Dublin county team.

He scored a goal in the 1955 All-Ireland Senior Football Championship Final.

He was Ireland's top-scoring forward in 1955 and 1959.

With 23–242 (311 points), Freaney is Dublin's seventh all-time highest scorer in league and championship.

He made 90 appearances for his county in league and championship.

Alongside Kevin Heffernan, Freaney pioneered Dublin's more "scientific" approach, which did not work too well when they met Kerry.

Freaney won 13 Dublin Senior Football Championships with St Vincents.

Freaney owned one of the country's biggest accountancy companies. He married Kathleen Mullen from Portnablagh, County Donegal. He died while holidaying in Donegal in 1991.

References

Year of birth missing
1991 deaths
Dublin inter-county Gaelic footballers
Gaelic football forwards